The 2017 Barbados Premier League (officially the Digicel Premier League for sponsorship reasons) is the 71st season of the highest tier of football in Barbados. UWI Blackbirds are the defending champions, coming off their first league title.

Changes from 2016
 Empire Club and Pinelands United were relegated to Barbados Division One.
 Ellerton and Waterford Compton were promoted to the Premier League.

Table

Positions by round

Statistics

Top scorers

Hat-tricks

4 Player scored 4 goals.

References

2011
Barb
Barb
football